From Nurse To Worse is a 1940 short subject directed by Jules White starring American slapstick comedy team The Three Stooges (Moe Howard, Larry Fine and Curly Howard). It is the 49th entry in the series released by Columbia Pictures starring the comedians, who released 190 shorts for the studio between 1934 and 1959.

Plot 
The Stooges are paper hangers who run into their old friend Jerry, an insurance salesman (Lynton Brent). He promises them that if they take out a policy on Curly proving that he has gone insane, they can collect $500 a month. Moe and Larry bring Curly on a leash to the office of Dr. D. Lerious (Vernon Dent). Curly's pretending to be a hound is so over the top that the doctor declares that he must operate. The Stooges flee, and hide out in the back of a dog catcher's truck,  where they are soon infested with fleas. Dr. D. Lerious eventually catches up with the Stooges, and Curly is sent straight for the operating room. Eventually, the trio get away on a gurney, encounter Jerry again and then give him the works.

Cast

Credited
Moe Howard as Moe
Larry Fine as Larry
Curly Howard as Curly

Uncredited
Lynton Brent as Jerry
Vernon Dent as Dr. D. Lerious
Dudley Dickerson as orderly
Dorothy Appleby as Dr. D. Lerious' receptionist
Evelyn Young as woman in Dr. D. Lerious' office
Ned Glass as dog catcher
Charles Dorety as dog catcher
Cy Schindell as policeman
John Tyrrell as assistant surgeon
Blanche Payson as hospital admissions nurse
Al Thompson as orderly
Johnny Kascier as battered orderly
Joe Palma as male nurse

Production notes
From Nurse to Worse was filmed on May 15–18, 1940. The film marked the first appearance of supporting player Joe Palma in a Stooge film.

The footage of the Stooges sailing through the city streets was lifted from Dizzy Doctors. The voice on the police scanner is Moe's.

References

External links 
 
 
From Nurse To Worse at threestooges.net

1940 films
The Three Stooges films
American black-and-white films
Films directed by Jules White
1940 comedy films
Columbia Pictures short films
American slapstick comedy films
1940s English-language films
1940s American films